The 2003 Sirius 400 was the 15th stock car race of the 2003 NASCAR Winston Cup Series season and the 35th iteration of the event. The race was held on Sunday, June 15, 2003, before a crowd of 160,000 in Brooklyn, Michigan, at Michigan International Speedway, a two-mile (3.2 km) moderate-banked D-shaped speedway. The race took the scheduled 200 laps to complete. At race's end, Kurt Busch of Roush Racing would make adjustments at the end of the race to pass Hendrick Motorsports driver Jeff Gordon on lap 177, and hold off Bobby Labonte of Joe Gibbs Racing to win his seventh career NASCAR Winston Cup Series win and his third of the season. Labonte and Gordon would fill out the podium, finishing second and third, respectively.

Background 

The race was held at Michigan International Speedway, a two-mile (3.2 km) moderate-banked D-shaped speedway located in Brooklyn, Michigan. The track is used primarily for NASCAR events. It is known as a "sister track" to Texas World Speedway as MIS's oval design was a direct basis of TWS, with moderate modifications to the banking in the corners, and was used as the basis of Auto Club Speedway. The track is owned by International Speedway Corporation. Michigan International Speedway is recognized as one of motorsports' premier facilities because of its wide racing surface and high banking (by open-wheel standards; the 18-degree banking is modest by stock car standards).

Entry list 

*Driver changed to Geoff Bodine for the race due to an injury Brett had suffered during the Happy Hour practice session.

Practice

First practice 
The first practice session was held on Friday, June 13, at 11:00 AM EST, and would last for 2 hours.

Second practice 
The second practice session was held on Saturday, June 14, at 9:30 AM EST, and would last for 45 minutes.

Third and final practice 
The third and final practice session, sometimes referred to as Happy Hour, was held on Saturday, June 14, at 11:10 AM EST, and would last for 45 minutes.

In the practice session, Brett Bodine would suffer a violent crash that would result in a broken right clavicle. As a result, brother Geoff Bodine would replace him for the race.

Qualifying 
Qualifying was held on Friday, June 13, at 3:05 PM EST. Each driver would have two laps to set a fastest time; the fastest of the two would count as their official qualifying lap. Positions 1-36 would be decided on time, while positions 37-43 would be based on provisionals. Six spots are awarded by the use of provisionals based on owner's points. The seventh is awarded to a past champion who has not otherwise qualified for the race. If no past champ needs the provisional, the next team in the owner points will be awarded a provisional.

Jimmy Spencer would blow an engine in the session. He was forced to use a provisional.

Two drivers would fail to qualify: Mike Skinner and Larry Foyt.

Full qualifying results

Race results

References 

2003 NASCAR Winston Cup Series
NASCAR races at Michigan International Speedway
June 2003 sports events in the United States
2003 in sports in Michigan